Loyalhanna is a census-designated place (CDP) in Westmoreland County, Pennsylvania, United States. The population was 3,415 at the 2000 census, at which time it was listed as McChesneytown-Loyalhanna, before just becoming the CDP of Loyalhanna for the 2010 census.  As of the 2010 census the population was 3,428 residents.

Geography
Loyalhanna is located at  (40.314197, -79.361280).

Demographics

As of the census of 2000, there were 3,415 people, 1,464 households, and 1,030 families residing in the CDP. The population density was 1,462.3 people per square mile (563.5/km2). There were 1,536 housing units at an average density of 657.7/sq mi (253.4/km2). The racial makeup of the CDP was 99.33% White, 0.26% African American, 0.03% Native American, 0.18% Asian, and 0.20% from two or more races. Hispanic or Latino of any race were 0.20% of the population.

There were 1,464 households, out of which 24.7% had children under the age of 18 living with them, 56.4% were married couples living together, 10.0% had a female householder with no husband present, and 29.6% were non-families. 26.4% of all households were made up of individuals, and 14.5% had someone living alone who was 65 years of age or older. The average household size was 2.31 and the average family size was 2.78.

In the CDP, the population was spread out, with 19.7% under the age of 18, 5.8% from 18 to 24, 26.6% from 25 to 44, 26.1% from 45 to 64, and 21.9% who were 65 years of age or older. The median age was 44 years. For every 100 females, there were 92.7 males. For every 100 females age 18 and over, there were 89.0 males.

The median income for a household in the CDP was $34,018, and the median income for a family was $40,845. Males had a median income of $32,292 versus $21,849 for females. The per capita income for the CDP was $18,041. About 6.0% of families and 7.5% of the population were below the poverty line, including 10.7% of those under age 18 and 7.6% of those age 65 or over.

References

Census-designated places in Westmoreland County, Pennsylvania
Pittsburgh metropolitan area
Census-designated places in Pennsylvania